Jiří Látal (born February 2, 1967) is a retired Czech professional ice hockey player. He spent most of his hockey career in the Czech Republic but spent parts of three NHL seasons with the Philadelphia Flyers.

In December 2009, he served as the General Manager of the Czech Republic team competing in the IIHF World Junior Hockey Championships in Regina, Saskatchewan.

Career statistics

Regular season and playoffs

International

External links
 

1967 births
Czech ice hockey defencemen
Czechoslovak ice hockey defencemen
Hershey Bears players
Living people
Sportspeople from Olomouc
HC Sparta Praha players
HC Olomouc players
VHK Vsetín players
Philadelphia Flyers players
Toronto Maple Leafs draft picks
Czechoslovak expatriate sportspeople in Norway
Czechoslovak expatriate sportspeople in the United States
Czechoslovak expatriate ice hockey people
Expatriate ice hockey players in Norway
Czech expatriate sportspeople in Norway
Czech expatriate ice hockey players in Finland
Expatriate ice hockey players in the United States